is a Japanese professional wrestler, mixed martial artist and professional wrestling trainer. In professional wrestling, he is known for his hard hitting offense. He is currently working for New Japan Pro-Wrestling (NJPW). In NJPW, he is a former three-time NEVER Openweight Champion, a one-time IWGP Tag Team Champion (with Hirooki Goto), and the winner of the 2017 New Japan Cup. He is also a former holder of Revolution Pro Wrestling's British Heavyweight Championship. Since March 2018, Shibata has served as the head coach of NJPW's dojo in Los Angeles.

Early life
Shibata attended Kuwana Kogyo High School in Kuwana, Mie, where he was classmates with Hirooki Goto. The son of former Japan Pro Wrestling Alliance and New Japan Pro-Wrestling competitor Katsuhisa Shibata, Katsuyori was an amateur wrestler during his school days and was competing at national level in 1997.

Professional wrestling career

New Japan Pro-Wrestling (1999–2005)
Shibata made his professional wrestling debut on October 10, 1999, facing close friend Wataru Inoue at a New Japan Pro-Wrestling (NJPW) event. Alongside fellow rookies Hiroshi Tanahashi and Shinsuke Nakamura, Shibata became known as one of the "new Three Musketeers". In 2000, Shibata took part in the 2000 Young Lion Cup, eventually finishing 3rd place with 6 points. During the tournament he was involved in a serious incident when he hit Masakazu Fukuda with an elbow drop during a match. Fukuda was in a coma and died 4 days later in hospital. Shibata and Wataru worked their way up the junior ranks together, though Shibata was a slight step ahead of Inoue throughout their joint rise, and subsequently challenged for the IWGP Junior Heavyweight Championship first against Kendo Kashin on October 28, 2001, but lost. Shibata and Inoue also challenged for the IWGP Junior Heavyweight Tag Team Championship on two occasions both against Jado & Gedo, but lost both times. By 2003, Shibata graduated to the heavyweight division and joined the Makai Club wrestling as himself and as Makai #4. From there, he continued to rise in the ranks. In July 2003, Shibata challenged for both the IWGP Tag Team Championship and the IWGP U-30 Openweight Championship but failed to win either title. Shibata then entered the 2003 G1 Climax, where he placed 3rd in his block with 5 points. Shibata continued to grow in 2004. On July 19, 2004, he received his first shot at the IWGP Heavyweight Championship against Kazuyuki Fujita but lost by knockout. One month later, he entered the 2004 G1 Climax and won his block scoring eight points and defeated several former IWGP Champions including Masahiro Chono, Shinsuke Nakamura, and Genichiro Tenryu but would lose in the semi-finals to eventual winner: Hiroyoshi Tenzan. Following the G1, Shibata joined Masahiro Chono's new stable: Black New Japan, where he remained until eventually leaving New Japan in January 2005.

Independent circuit (2005–2007)
In 2005, Shibata left New Japan, becoming a freelancer and has most notably fought for Big Mouth Loud and Pro Wrestling Noah. One of his more famous matches during his freelancing years was a heated confrontation with former amateur wrestler Jun Akiyama. In Big Mouth Loud, Shibata took on several big names including Satoshi Kojima, Kensuke Sasaki, & Taru. In Noah, Shibata teamed with Kenta on several occasions including challenging for the GHC Tag Team Championship and defeating Go Shiozaki and Mitsuharu Misawa where Shibata pinned the future heavyweight champion: Shiozaki. On January 4, 2006, Shibata returned to New Japan at Toukon Shidou Chapter 1, where he defeated Hiroshi Tanahashi. Shibata's final match for nearly six years took place on December 31, 2006, when he defeated Kazuhiro Hamanaka. By January 2007, Shibata left wrestling to focus on mixed martial arts.

Inoki Genome Federation (2011)
On December 31, 2011, Shibata returned to professional wrestling to compete on the Inoki Genome Federation's (IGF) Fight For Japan: Genki Desu Ka Omisoka 2011 year end event. At the event, Shibata teamed with fellow pro wrestler-turned-mixed martial artist Kazushi Sakuraba to defeat the team of Shinichi Suzukawa and Atsushi Sawada.

Return to NJPW

Laughter 7 (2012–2015) 

On August 12, 2012, Shibata, alongside Kazushi Sakuraba, returned to NJPW. Shibata and Sakuraba wrestled their return match on September 23 at Destruction, defeating Hiromu Takahashi and Wataru Inoue in a tag team match. Shibata and Sakuraba, collectively dubbed Laughter7, continued their winning ways at the following two pay-per-views, King of Pro-Wrestling on October 8 and Power Struggle on November 11, both times defeating the team of Togi Makabe and Wataru Inoue. On January 4, 2013, at Wrestle Kingdom 7 in Tokyo Dome, Shibata suffered his first defeat since his return to professional wrestling, when he was defeated by Togi Makabe in a singles grudge match. On January 27, Shibata returned to Pro Wrestling Noah, once again affiliating himself with Kenta. Shibata and Sakuraba returned to their winning ways at the following New Japan pay-per-view, The New Beginning on February 10, where they defeated Hirooki Goto and Wataru Inoue in a tag team match. On April 7 at Invasion Attack, Shibata and Sakuraba suffered their first tag team loss, when they were defeated by Hirooki Goto and Yuji Nagata via referee stoppage, when Sakuraba was injured and unable to continue the match. Shibata and Goto faced off in a singles match on May 3 at Wrestling Dontaku 2013, which ended in a draw. A rematch between the two took place on June 22 at Dominion 6.22, where Shibata was victorious. A third match between the two on July 20 ended in another draw. From August 1 to 11, Shibata took part in the 2013 G1 Climax, where he finished with a record of five wins and four losses, with a loss against Hiroshi Tanahashi on the final day costing him a spot in the finals. On September 8, Shibata and Sakuraba took part in the Wrestle-1 promotion's inaugural event, defeating Masakatsu Funaki and Masayuki Kono in a tag team match. On December 7, Shibata made his in-ring return to Noah, defeating Maybach Taniguchi in a singles match.

On January 4, 2014, at Wrestle Kingdom 8 in Tokyo Dome, Shibata was defeated by Hirooki Goto, who was returning from an injury, which had kept him sidelined for the past five months. The match ended the rivalry between Shibata and Goto and led to the two forming a tag team. The two quickly entered the IWGP Tag Team Championship picture, defeating the reigning champions, Bullet Club (Doc Gallows and Karl Anderson), in a non-title match at New Japan's 42nd anniversary event on March 6. Shibata also expressed interest in challenging for the IWGP Heavyweight Championship, but was told by the reigning champion, Kazuchika Okada, to earn his title shot at the 2014 New Japan Cup. In order to win the tournament, Shibata announced he was bringing back his old finishing move, the octopus hold. Shibata, however, failed in his attempt to win the tournament, losing to Shelton X Benjamin in his second round match on March 22. On April 6 at Invasion Attack 2014, Shibata and Goto received a shot at the IWGP Tag Team Championship, but were defeated by Gallows and Anderson. From July 21 to August 8, Shibata took part in the 2014 G1 Climax, where he finished fourth in his block with a record of six wins and four losses. During the tournament final event on August 10, Shibata and Goto faced off in another singles match, where Shibata was victorious. After entering a rivalry with Shinsuke Nakamura and becoming the number one contender to his IWGP Intercontinental Championship, it was announced that Shibata would be working the full October to November "Road to Power Struggle" tour, his first full tour with New Japan since his return. Shibata received his title shot on November 8 at Power Struggle, but was defeated by Nakamura. Later in the month, Shibata and Goto entered the 2014 World Tag League, where they opened with a three match losing streak, only to come back and win their four remaining matches, winning their block and advancing to the finals. On December 7, Shibata and Goto defeated Doc Gallows and Karl Anderson in the finals to win the 2014 World Tag League. This led to a rematch between the two teams on January 4, 2015, at Wrestle Kingdom 9 in Tokyo Dome, where Shibata and Goto defeated Anderson and Gallows to become the new IWGP Tag Team Champions. Shibata and Goto's reign ended in their first defense on February 11 at The New Beginning in Osaka, where they were defeated by Anderson and Gallows.

On March 8, Shibata and Goto once again faced off in the second round of the 2015 New Japan Cup in a match, where Goto was victorious. On April 5, a rivalry ignited between Shibata and Kazushi Sakuraba, after Sakuraba submitted Shibata in a tag team match at Invasion Attack 2015. The two faced off on July 5 at Dominion 7.5 in Osaka-jo Hall in a match, where Shibata was victorious. From July 20 to August 14, Shibata took part in the 2015 G1 Climax, where he finished in the middle of his block with a record of four wins and five losses.

NEVER Openweight Champion (2016–2017) 

On January 4, 2016, at Wrestle Kingdom 10, Shibata won his first singles title in NJPW, when he defeated Tomohiro Ishii for the NEVER Openweight Championship. He made his first successful title defense on February 11 at The New Beginning in Osaka in a rematch against Ishii. On March 3, NJPW announced that Shibata had signed a one-year deal with the promotion, ending his 11-year run as a freelancer. Shibata made his next title defenses against NJPW veterans, defeating Satoshi Kojima on March 19 and Hiroyoshi Tenzan on April 10. On May 3 at Wrestling Dontaku 2016, Shibata lost the title to Yuji Nagata in his fourth defense. Shibata regained the title from Nagata on June 19 at Dominion 6.19 in Osaka-jo Hall. He made his first successful title defense on July 3 against Tomoaki Honma. From July 22 to August 13, Shibata took part in the 2016 G1 Climax, where he finished with a record of five wins and four losses. Shibata failed to advance to the finals due to losing to Evil on the final day. Through NJPW's relationship with Ring of Honor (ROH), Shibata made his debut for the American promotion on August 19 at Death Before Dishonor XIV, where he defeated Silas Young. The following day, Shibata unsuccessfully challenged Bobby Fish for the ROH World Television Championship. This led to a match on September 17 at Destruction in Tokyo, where Shibata successfully defended the NEVER Openweight Championship against Fish. The following month at King of Pro-Wrestling, Shibata also successfully defended the title against Fish's tag team partner Kyle O'Reilly. After this, he made a brief return to Pro Wrestling Noah as part of their working relationship with New Japan Pro Wrestling, teaming with Juice Robinson in a victory against Go Shiozaki and Mayback Taniguchi on October 22 at Autumn Navigation 2016 Day 6, and defeating Go Shiozaki in a singles match on October 23, at Great Voyage 2016 in Yokohoma Vol. 2. On November 5 at Power Struggle, Shibata lost the title to Evil. On November 15, Shibata regained the NEVER Openweight Championship from Evil on NJPW's Wrestling World 2016 event in Singapore. He lost the title to Hirooki Goto on January 4, 2017, at Wrestle Kingdom 11 in Tokyo Dome.

Injury and hiatus (2017–2021) 
On March 20, Shibata defeated Bad Luck Fale in the finals to win the 2017 New Japan Cup. Having earned the right to challenge for any heavyweight belt of his choosing, Shibata called out Kazuchika Okada and challenged him to a match for the IWGP Heavyweight Championship. On April 9 at Sakura Genesis 2017, Shibata was defeated by Okada in the IWGP Heavyweight Championship match. Following the match, Shibata collapsed backstage and was rushed to a hospital, where it was discovered that he had a subdural hematoma, which required emergency surgery. Shibata's injury was similar to that which killed mixed martial artist Tim Hague a couple of months later. The injury was caused by Shibata's repeated use of a headbutt as a signature move, something he had been doing regularly since the summer of 2016. This, combined with severe dehydration, caused Shibata to also experience some paralysis on the right side of his body. On April 13, Dave Meltzer reported that it was believed that Shibata would never be cleared to wrestle again. It was later reported that while Shibata was "probably" never going to wrestle again, NJPW were looking to sign him full-time as a coach. Shibata made an appearance at the 2017 G1 Climax finals on August 13, tearfully stating "I am still alive! That is all."

On March 4, in the midst of his recovery, it was announced that Shibata would be the head coach for New Japan's new dojo located in Los Angeles, California, where he trained the likes of Karl Fredericks, Clark Connors and Alex Coughlin. On August 12, Shibata accompanied Hiroshi Tanahashi to ringside for his G1 Climax 28 Finals match against Kota Ibushi where Tanahashi would be victorious.

On June 9, 2019, at Dominion 6.9 in Osaka-jo Hall, Shibata returned to introduce the debuting KENTA. On August 12, on the final night of G1 Climax 29, KENTA joined Bullet Club, resulting in Shibata rushing the ring to fight him, ultimately ending with Shibata being beat down by KENTA and other members of Bullet Club. This marked the first time Shibata had engaged in physical wrestling since his injury. At Power Struggle, Shibata was once again ambushed by KENTA during the main event of Jay White and Hirooki Goto as he was attempting to aid his former tag partner.

Return (2021–present) 
On the final night of G1 Climax 31 on October 21, 2021, Shibata wrestled Zack Sabre Jr. in a 5-minute UWF rules exhibition which ended in a draw. Afterwards, Shibata spoke to the crowd and said that he feels good, and the next time he steps in that ring it will be a proper wrestling match. On December 15, 2021, Shibata made the announcement that he would wrestle at the January 4, 2022, Wrestle Kingdom 16 event, his first official match since April 2017. In this event, Shibata defeated Ren Narita.

Revolution Pro Wrestling (2016–2017)
In addition to the United States, through their working relationship with NJPW, he debuted for UK-based Revolution Pro Wrestling (RPW) at their Summer Sizzler 2016 event on July 10, unsuccessfully challenging Zack Sabre Jr. for the British Heavyweight Championship. In November 2016, Shibata returned to RPW at Global Wars UK, a cross-promoted show with NJPW. On first night, he defeated Zack Sabre Jr. to win the British Heavyweight Championship, and then successfully defended the title against Chris Hero on second night. On January 21, 2017, Shibata made another successful title defense against Matt Riddle at RPW's High Stakes event. He lost the title back to Sabre at NJPW's 45th anniversary show on March 6 thanks to an assist from Minoru Suzuki and Suzuki Gun.

All Elite Wrestling (2022)
On June 26, 2022, Shibata appeared at AEW x NJPW: Forbidden Door to save Orange Cassidy from a post-match beatdown from United Empire.  Later, on the November 2 episode of AEW Dynamite, Shibata once again saved Cassidy from an attack by Pac, and signed for a match against Cassidy for the AEW All Atlantic Championship, on the November 4 edition of AEW Rampage. In his AEW in-ring debut, Shibata was defeated by Cassidy, the duo shook hands and posed after the match.

Mixed martial arts career
Shibata debuted in mixed martial arts on May 15, 2004 at JF Jungle Fights 2 where he defeated Webster Dauphiney by an arm triangle choke in Round 1. Shibata returned to MMA in 2007 where he joined the Fighting and Entertainment Group (FEG) promoted K-1 Hero's, in his K-1 Hero's debut on March 12, 2007, at Hero's 8, he defeated Yoshihisa Yamamoto by TKO in 9 seconds. After two victories, Shibata went on a five fight losing streak. He lost to Ralek Gracie at K-1 Hero's: Middleweight Tournament Opening Round by submitting to an armbar. Shibata then lost to Kazushi Sakuraba at K-1 Hero's Tournament Final once again submitting to an armbar. Shibata fought his last K-1 Hero's fight at K-1 Olympia Hero'S 2007 in Korea on October 28, 2007, against Heo Min Seok. Shibata lost the fight by TKO in the 2nd round.

In 2008, Shibata began fighting for FEG's new organization: Dream. His first fight at Dream was a loss to Jason "Mayhem" Miller at Dream 3 by TKO. His next fight was against Yoshihiro Akiyama losing to him by Submission. Shibata then fought at Deep where he drew with Yasuhito Namekawa at Deep: 38 Impact. He then lost to Hayato Sakurai by TKO at Dynamite!! 2008. In a shocking start, Shibata charged across the ring and almost fell through the ropes when Sakurai dodged him, and then unloaded all his offensive with the intention to end the fight early, but Hayato took him down and punished him methodically until the stoppage.

After going winless for two years, Shibata would score his biggest victory to date at Dream 8 when he defeated Ikuhisa Minowa by Unanimous Decision. Later that year at Dream 12, he defeated fellow New Japan Pro-Wrestling alumni: Tokimitsu Ishizawa by TKO. At Dynamite!! 2009, Shibata lost to Hiroshi Izumi by unanimous decision.

Shibata returned to Deep for two appearances in 2010. On June 6, 2010, he lost to Young Choi by unanimous decision. On October 24, he then faced Deep Light Heavyweight Champion Yoshiyuki Nakanishi at Deep: 50th Impact which he lost by TKO.

His most recent fight was a defeat to Ryuta Sakurai via TKO on August 26, 2011, at Deep: 55 Impact.

Championships and accomplishments

New Japan Pro-Wrestling
IWGP Tag Team Championship (1 time) – with Hirooki Goto
NEVER Openweight Championship (3 times)
New Japan Cup (2017)
World Tag League (2014) – with Hirooki Goto
Fighting Spirit Award (2004)
Tag Team Best Bout (2004) with Masahiro Chono vs. Hiroyoshi Tenzan and Shinsuke Nakamura on October 24
Pro Wrestling Illustrated
Ranked No. 23 of the top 500 singles wrestlers in the PWI 500 in 2017
 Revolution Pro Wrestling
British Heavyweight Championship (1 time)
 Tokyo Sports
Fighting Spirit Award (2017)
Wrestling Observer Newsletter
Best Brawler (2013)

Kickboxing record

|-  bgcolor="#FFBBBB"
| 2003-11-03 || Loss ||align=left|Hiromi Amada || NJPW: Yokohama Dead Out || Yokohama, Japan || KO (left knee to the body) || 2 || 2:08 || 0-1
|-
| colspan=9 | Legend:

Mixed martial arts record

|-
| Loss
| align=center| 4–11–1
| Ryuta Sakurai
| TKO (punches) 
| Deep: 55 Impact
| 
| align=center| 2
| align=center| 3:04
| Tokyo, Japan
| 
|-
| Loss
| align=center| 
| Satoshi Ishii
| Submission (kimura) 
| K-1 World Max 2010 World Championship Tournament Final
| 
| align=center| 1
| align=center| 3:30
| Tokyo, Japan
| 
|-
| Loss
| align=center| 4–9–1
| Yoshiyuki Nakanishi	
| TKO (punches) 
| Deep: 50 Impact
| 
| align=center| 1
| align=center| 4:06
| Tokyo, Japan
| 
|-
| Loss
| align=center| 4–8–1
| Young Choi
| Decision (unanimous) 
| Deep: Cage Impact 2010 in Osaka
| 
| align=center| 3
| align=center| 5:00
| Osaka, Japan
| 
|-
| Loss
| align=center| 4–7–1
| Hiroshi Izumi
| Decision (unanimous) 
| Dynamite!! The Power of Courage 2009
| 
| align=center| 3
| align=center| 5:00
| Saitama, Saitama, Japan
| 
|-
| Win
| align=center| 4–6–1
| Tokimitsu Ishizawa
| TKO (punches) 
| Dream 12
| 
| align=center| 1
| align=center| 4:52
| Osaka, Japan
| 
|-
| Win
| align=center| 3–6–1
| Ikuhisa Minowa
| Decision (unanimous) 
| Dream 8
| 
| align=center| 2
| align=center| 5:00
| Nagoya, Japan
| 
|-
| Loss
| align=center| 2–6–1
| Hayato Sakurai
| TKO (punches)
| Fields Dynamite!! 2008
| 
| align=center| 1
| align=center| 7:01
| Saitama, Japan
| 
|-
| Draw
| align=center| 2–5–1
| Yasuhito Namekawa
| Draw
| Deep: 38 Impact
| 
| align=center| 3
| align=center| 5:00
| Tokyo, Japan
| 
|-
| Loss
| align=center| 2–5
| Yoshihiro Akiyama
| Technical Submission (ezekiel choke)
| Dream 5: Lightweight Grand Prix 2008 Final Round
| 
| align=center| 1
| align=center| 6:34
| Osaka, Japan
| 
|-
| Loss
| align=center| 2–4
| Jason Miller
| TKO (punches)
| Dream 3: Lightweight Grand Prix 2008 Second Round
| 
| align=center| 1
| align=center| 6:57
| Saitama, Japan
| 
|-
| Loss
| align=center| 2–3
| Heo Min Seok
| TKO (punches)
| Hero's 2007 in Korea
| 
| align=center| 2
| align=center| 1:31
| Seoul, South Korea
| 
|-
| Loss
| align=center| 2–2
| Kazushi Sakuraba
| Submission (armbar)
| Hero's 10
| 
| align=center| 1
| align=center| 6:20
| Yokohama, Japan
| 
|-
| Loss
| align=center| 2–1
| Ralek Gracie
| Submission (armbar)
| Hero's 9
| 
| align=center| 1
| align=center| 3:05
| Yokohama, Japan
| 
|-
| Win
| align=center| 2–0
| Yoshihisa Yamamoto
| TKO (punches)
| Hero's 8
| 
| align=center| 1
| align=center| 0:09
| Nagoya, Japan
| 
|-
| Win
| align=center| 1–0
| Webster Dauphiney 
| Submission (arm-triangle choke)
| Jungle Fight 2
| 
| align=center| 1
| align=center| 0:52
| Manaus, Brazil
|

See also
List of professional wrestlers by MMA record

References

External links 

 
 
 

Japanese male professional wrestlers
Japanese male kickboxers
Heavyweight kickboxers
Japanese male mixed martial artists
Heavyweight mixed martial artists
Mixed martial artists utilizing wrestling
Mixed martial artists utilizing kickboxing
Sportspeople from Mie Prefecture
1979 births
Living people
NEVER Openweight champions
IWGP Heavyweight Tag Team Champions
Undisputed British Heavyweight Champions